"Jean" is a popular song from the 1969 movie The Prime of Miss Jean Brodie. It was written by the American poet and composer Rod McKuen, who also recorded a version of the song.

Background
The song was the theme to the 1969 film adaptation of Dame Muriel Spark's The Prime of Miss Jean Brodie, which starred noted British film actress Maggie Smith. Smith won an Academy Award for Best Actress for her portrayal of the lead character in the film, Jean Brodie. The song was performed by songwriter McKuen, who was nominated for an Academy Award in the category Best Original Song. Although released as a single in the summer of 1969, McKuen's version of the song failed to reach the American music charts.

Oliver recording
"Jean" was also recorded by the American singer Oliver. Earlier in 1969, Oliver had reached #3 on the Billboard pop and easy listening charts with his version of "Good Morning Starshine," a song from the musical Hair. While working on an album with producer Bob Crewe (which would also be called Good Morning Starshine), "Jean" was selected as a song for the record and subsequently chosen as the follow-up single. It became another hit for the singer, reaching #2 on the US pop charts, where "Sugar, Sugar" by The Archies kept it from #1. In Canada, the song reached #1, both Pop and AC. "Jean" spent four weeks at #1 on the US adult contemporary chart. Oliver would later describe his cover version of the song: "We had no idea it would be a single. It was a 3/4 ballad in the psychedelic era...it was a beautiful arrangement."

Chart history

Weekly charts

Year-end charts

Other recordings
Sergio Franchi performed the song on the January 3, 1971, broadcast of The Ed Sullivan Show, subsequently released on a rare Franchi DVD.

See also
List of RPM number-one singles of 1969
List of number-one adult contemporary singles of 1969 (U.S.)

References

External links
 

1969 singles
Oliver (singer) songs
RPM Top Singles number-one singles
Best Original Song Golden Globe winning songs
Song recordings produced by Bob Crewe
Songs written for films
Songs written by Rod McKuen
1969 songs